Christopher Mireles Suazo (born 25 November 1992) is a Mexican male BMX rider, representing his nation at international competitions. He competed in the time trial event at the 2015 UCI BMX World Championships.

Mireles also competed at the 2010 Summer Youth Olympics, the 2011 Pan American Games, the 2014 Central American and Caribbean Games, and the 2015 Pan American Games.

Notes

References

External links
 
 
 
 
 

1992 births
Living people
BMX riders
Mexican male cyclists
Sportspeople from Guadalajara, Jalisco
Competitors at the 2014 Central American and Caribbean Games
Cyclists at the 2010 Summer Youth Olympics
Cyclists at the 2011 Pan American Games
Cyclists at the 2015 Pan American Games